Bennett Hill Griffin (September 22, 1895 – April 26, 1978) was an American aviator. Griffin was born in Mississippi in 1895, but was raised in Oklahoma arriving around 1900. In 1932, Griffin along with Jimmie Mattern attempted to break the world record for aerial circumnavigation set by Wiley Post and Harold Gatty. In 1946 / 1947, he administered the relocation of the Civil Aeronautics Administration center from Houston to Oklahoma City, where it later became known as the FAA's Mike Monroney Aeronautical Center. He served as the Director of Washington National Airport from 1947 until 1959. In 1941, he was also the first pilot to land at National Airport, flying for American Airlines at the time. He died in 1978 and was buried in Arlington National Cemetery.

Aerial circumnavigation record attempts
July 1932, Griffin and Jimmie Mattern flew "The Century of Progress", a Lockheed Vega, powered by a Pratt & Whitney Wasp engine, from Floyd Bennett Field, New York to Harbor Grace, Newfoundland, and then non-stop to Berlin, Germany in 18:41 hours. They continued as far as Borisov, Belarus, USSR in this failed round-the-world flight attempt. They did set a new record for crossing the Atlantic Ocean in 10 hours, 50 minutes.

Honors
1973 National Aeronautic Association Wesley L. McDonald Elder Statesman Award

References

External links

Oklahoma Historical Society - GRIFFIN, BENNETT HILL (1895-1978)
VICTOR E. WICKERSHAM COLLECTION - Mentions Griffin's Legion of Merit citation and Distinguished Flying Cross
 Encyclopedia of Oklahoma History and Culture - Griffin, Bennett

1895 births
1978 deaths
American aviators
Aviators from Mississippi
People from Marshall County, Mississippi
Aviators from Oklahoma
Recipients of the Distinguished Flying Cross (United States)
Recipients of the Legion of Merit
Burials at Arlington National Cemetery
American aviation record holders